Farthinghoe Nature Reserve is a 3.7 hectare Local Nature Reserve north-west of Brackley in Northamptonshire. It is owned by Northamptonshire County Council and managed by the Wildlife Trust for Bedfordshire, Cambridgeshire and Northamptonshire.

This former landfill site has grassland, ponds and woodland. Flowers include lady's bedstraw, meadow vetchling and snake's-head fritillary. There are fauna such as marbled white and green-veined white butterflies, and pipistrelle and noctule bats.

There is access from Purston Lane.

References

External links
Farthinghoe leaflet

Local Nature Reserves in Northamptonshire
Wildlife Trust for Bedfordshire, Cambridgeshire and Northamptonshire reserves